Brachyiulus stuxbergi is a species of millipede in the genus Brachyiulus. It is endemic to Malta, specifically Gozo, and central to southern Italy including Sicily and the Aegadian Islands. Outside Italy, it is found in Tunisia, Algeria, and Greece.

References

Animals described in 1875
Julida
Millipedes of Europe